The DuMont Television Network was launched in 1946 and ceased broadcasting in 1956. Allen DuMont, who created the network, preserved most of what it produced in kinescope format. By 1958, however, much of the library had been destroyed to recover the silver content of the film prints, and eventually the remaining material was simply discarded. Since then, there has been extensive research on which DuMont programs have episodes extant.

For a list of program series aired on DuMont, see List of programs broadcast by the DuMont Television Network.

Held by the UCLA Film and Television Archive

 A.N.T.A. Album of 1955 – special shown on March 28, 1955
 The Admiral Broadway Revue – one episode (March 4, 1949)
 All About Baby – three episodes (June–July 1955)
 The Bigelow Theatre – nine episodes, including October 4, 1951, and series finale from December 27)
 Boxing From Eastern Parkway – 30 episodes, ranging from December 1, 1952, to October 26, 1953
 Boxing From St. Nicholas Arena – five episodes (including August 6, 1956, finale, the last program aired on DuMont)
 Boxing With Dennis James – three episodes from 1949 to 1950, possibly including episodes of Boxing From Jamaica Arena (1948–49), Amateur Boxing Fight Club (1949–50) or Boxing From Sunnyside Gardens (1949–55)
 Captain Video and His Video Rangers – 24 episodes, ranging from at least 1949–1953
 Cavalcade of Bands - 1 episode from September 4, 1951, with Charlie Spivak and Orch., The Haydens, Morey Amsterdam, The Mello-Larks, Bob Hammond’s Birds, others.
 Cavalcade of Stars – 15 episodes, ranging from September 1949 to October 26, 1951
 Champagne and Orchids – two episodes (with guests Eric Thorsen and Yul Brynner)
 Charlie Wild, Private Detective – two episodes (including May 6, 1952; UCLA has another 13 episodes from the CBS and ABC eras)
 Colonel Humphrey Flack – 12 episodes, ranging from October 14, 1953, to February 9, 1954
 Concert Tonight – one episode from 1954 and one from 1953.  The latter aired on WGN on December 3, 1953, though it's unclear when it aired over the network.  
Cosmopolitan Theatre - one episode from October 23, 1951, "Reward, One Million".  
 Dark of Night – one episode (January 30, 1953)
 Doorway to Fame – two episodes (March 30 and April 1949)
Eloise Salutes the Stars - one episode from Jan. 4, 1952, featuring guest Elsa Maxwell.  
 Front Page Detective – 17 episodes
 Front Row Center – one episode from 1949
 Georgetown University Forum – one episode (December 13, 1951)
 The Goldbergs – 71 restored episodes, including DuMont, available on DVD
 The Growing Paynes – one episode from 1949
 Gruen Playhouse – two episodes (May 22 and June 19, 1952)
 Guide Right – 18 episodes
Happy's Party - a 10 minute segment from February 5, 1955, aired on KDKA-TV Pittsburgh.  (WDTV changed to KDKA-TV only a few days prior, and the show was long off the network by this point, but it's the only surviving example of the program)  
 International Playhouse – 12 episodes (although not all can be confirmed as DuMont episodes)
 Jimmy Hughes, Rookie Cop – one episode (network premiere from May 8, 1953)
 The Johns Hopkins Science Review – three episodes (1951; October 7, 1952; and 1953), one of which features Wernher von Braun
 Joseph Schildkraut Presents – one episode (November 18, 1953); another six episodes, ranging from December 4, 1951, to April 23, 1952, are from the earlier ABC series Personal Appearance Theatre, which also featured Schildkraut and may have been shown on DuMont stations
 Kids and Company – one episode (season one finale, June 1, 1952), one of the very few surviving daytime DuMont broadcasts; while host Johnny Olson states that the program is going on a ten-week hiatus.   Featured is Kid of the Year, Jimmy Carrick.  
 Life Is Worth Living – four episodes (October 1951 and three from 1955)
 The Magic Cottage – two episodes (1950 and February 27, 1954)
Major Dell Conway of The Flying Tigers - 20 episodes from the series run.  
 Marge and Jeff – 27 episodes (ranging from September 28, 1953, to September 1, 1954), one excerpt (May 20, 1954)
 Melody Street – two episodes (including January 1, 1954), one excerpt
 The Morey Amsterdam Show – 48 episodes, ranging from November 21, 1949, to August 31, 1950.
 Newsweek Views the News (also known as Newsweek Analysis) – two episodes (February 27 and April 17, 1950)
 Not for Publication – 12 episodes, including shows ranging from May 13, 1951, to April 15, 1952
 The Original Amateur Hour – three episodes, one excerpt
 Pantomime Quiz – two episodes, plus a larger number of CBS episodes
 Passaic: Birthplace of Television and the DuMont Story (early television movie) – live television play aired November 14, 1951
 The Paul Dixon Show – one episode (network premiere from September 29, 1952)
 Pulse of the City – three episodes from 1953
 Rocky King, Inside Detective – 37 episodes, ranging from 1951 to 1954
 Star Time – four episodes (November 21 and 28, 1950 plus January 16 and February 6, 1951), one excerpt
Time For Reflection - one episode from December, 1950
The Stranger – two episodes (September 24 and November 12, 1954)
 The Ted Steele Show – one episode (series finale from July 12, 1949)
 This Is Music – two episodes (1951 and April 1952)
 Top 12 Business Leaders (30-minute special aired May 28, 1951, from the 21 Club in New York City)
 The Vincent Lopez Show – one episode from 1950
 Window on the World – one episode (March 25, 1949)
 Wisdom of the Ages – one episode (June 16, 1953)
 You Asked for It – two episodes (#8 and #31)

Held by the Paley Center for Media

In addition to the below, there is one listing each for Famous Jury Trials and Small Fry Club, neither of which have any information other than the catalog number.

 Adlai Stevenson Speech From Salt Lake City – telecast of a speech by presidential candidate Adlai Stevenson hosted by U.S. Representative from Utah Walter K. Granger (14 October 1952)
 The Admiral Broadway Revue – 18 episodes of the 19-show run, including the January 28 premiere and June 3 finale
 And Everything Nice – one episode from 1949
 At Home With Billie Burke – one episode
 Better Living TV Theater – one episode ("From Every Mountain Top")
 The Big Issue (a.k.a. Keep Posted) – one episode ("Peace in the Middle East", aired November 2, 1952)
 Blind Date – one episode (August 25, 1953)
 The Cases of Eddie Drake – one episode, "Sleep Well, Angel" (May 1, 1952)
 Cavalcade of Stars – 17 episodes, possibly more (the Paley Center has several further Cavalcade kinescopes, for which the exact content is unclear)
 Charlie Wild, Private Detective – four episodes, possibly five
 Colonel Humphrey Flack – two episodes
 Court of Current Issues – 14-minute fragment (March 3, 1949)
 Dollar a Second – one episode
 The Ernie Kovacs Show/The Ernie Kovacs Rehearsal – one episode (March 21, 1955); although only airing on flagship station WABD, at least one major historian considers it a DuMont program since the network intended to broadcast it nationally, a plan that came just months before the network's collapse.
 Flight to Rhythm – two episodes (March 10 and May 15, 1949)
 The Growing Paynes – four episodes, possibly five
 Guide Right – two episodes (including August 14, 1953)
 Hold That Camera – one episode (December 1, 1950)
 The Johns Hopkins Science Review – eight episodes, ranging from September 18, 1951, to February 2, 1953 (plus one marked as "series finale")
 Kids and Company – two episodes (March 25, 1952, sometimes listed as 1951 and May 24, 1952, season one finale, often listed as June 1 
 Life Begins at Eighty – one episode
 Life Is Worth Living – unknown number
 The Magic Cottage – one episode (December 28, 1950)
 Marge and Jeff – four episodes from 1954
 The Morey Amsterdam Show – two episodes (April 28 and June 9, 1949; features Art Carney in a supporting role)
 New York Times Youth Forum – one episode (September 27, 1952)
 Once Upon a Tune – three episodes from 1951, including May 8 (a rare example of satirical programming from DuMont)
 Opera Cameos – eight episodes, including December 13, 1953, and March 12, 1955
 Operation Success – two episodes from 1948
 Photographic Horizons – one episode (August 25, 1948)
 Rocky King, Inside Detective – seven episodes, including November 15, 1953
 Stop the Play – one episode
 Swing Into Sports – one episode (August 29, 1948) of series on WABD
 This Is Music – two episodes

Held by the Museum of Broadcast Communications

 The Admiral Broadway Revue – one episode
 The Adventures of Ellery Queen – one episode
 Captain Video and His Video Rangers – two episodes
 Cavalcade of Stars – one episode
 Don McNeill's Breakfast Club – two episodes
 The Johns Hopkins Science Review – one episode
 Kids and Company – one episode
 Life Is Worth Living – five episodes
 Miss U.S. Television Grand Finals – special aired September 30, 1950
 The Morey Amsterdam Show – five episodes
 Public Prosecutor – one episode
 Rocky King, Inside Detective – one episode
 Sense and Nonsense – one episode (February 19, 1954); sources indicate that this was a local series aired on WABD
 Sports Showcase – one episode
 They Stand Accused – one episode
 Tom Corbett, Space Cadet – one episode
 Twenty Questions – one episode (January 18, 1952)
 Washington Journal – one episode (unknown; possibly an episode of Washington Report [1951] or Washington Exclusive [1953], both broadcast by DuMont)

Held by the Library of Congress

The J. Fred & Leslie W. MacDonald Collection, formerly MacDonald & Associates film archive in Chicago, is now held by the Library of Congress. In addition to the below, the collection also holds eighteen 30- and 60-second commercials produced in 1951 for DuMont TV receivers.

 The Admiral Broadway Revue – three half-hour segments
 The Adventures of Ellery Queen – one episode (December 21, 1950)
 The Alan Dale Show – one episode (June 1948 )
 The Armed Forces Hour – two 15-minute segments
 The Arthur Murray Party – one hour-long episode, one half-hour episode, and four half-hour segments
 The Bigelow Theatre (a.k.a. Hollywood Half Hour and Marquee Theatre in syndication) – one CBS episode from February 11, 1951 ("Agent from Scotland Yard"), may have aired on DuMont during the fall of 1951
 Captain Video and His Video Rangers – one episode
 Cavalcade of Stars – one full Gleason episode and three segments
 Chance of a Lifetime – one episode
 Dilemma – one episode
 Easy Aces – one episode
 Eloise Salutes the Stars – two episodes, weekly series hosted by Eloise McElhone
 Fashions on Parade – two episodes
 Flash Gordon – two episodes, "Escape into Time" (October 8, 1954) and "The Witch of Neptune" (March 4, 1955)
 Hold That Camera – one episode (October 20, 1950)
 It's a Small World – one episode from 1953
 Life Begins at Eighty – two episodes
 Life Is Worth Living – six episodes
 The Morey Amsterdam Show – two half-hour segments
 Night Editor – entire series (46 episodes)
 The Old American Barn Dance – three episodes
 Pentagon Washington – one episode (series finale from November 24, 1952)
 The Plainclothesman – one episode
 Rebound (a.k.a. Counterpoint in syndication) – two episodes
 Rocky King, Inside Detective – two episodes
 Sports for All – one episode
 Star Time – five half-hour segments
 Stars on Parade – two episodes
 Steve Randall (a.k.a. Hollywood Off-Beat) – four episodes from 1952 (June 12, July 3, August 14, and September 11)
 They Stand Accused – one episode (December 23, 1950)
 Twenty Questions – one episode (January 18, 1952)
 What's the Story – one episode (December 1953), featuring interviews with Allen B. DuMont and Dr. Thomas T. Goldsmith Jr.
 Who's Who With Wendy Barrie – one episode (June 1949)

Held by TV4U
TV4U was a service of the TVS Television Network. Much of its archive can be found at TVS's Dailymotion page.

Note: Only one episode of the following.
 The Admiral Broadway Revue – one episode
 Captain Video and His Video Rangers – one episode
 The Cases of Eddie Drake – one episode
 Cavalcade of Stars – one episode
 Don McNeill's Breakfast Club – one episode
 Front Page Detective – one episode
 Hold That Camera – one episode (December 1, 1950)
 The Morey Amsterdam Show – one episode
 Okay, Mother – one episode (July 18, 1950)
 Rebound (a.k.a. Counterpoint in syndication) – one episode
 Rocky King, Inside Detective – one episode
 Sense and Nonsense – one episode (February 19, 1954)
 Star Time – one episode
 Tom Corbett, Space Cadet – one episode
 Twenty Questions – one episode (January 18, 1952)

Held by the Internet Archive
The Internet Archive collection is limited to those shows which have lapsed into the public domain.

 The Adventures of Ellery Queen – four episodes (December 21, 1950, plus March 29, May 10, and November 8, 1951)
 The Arthur Murray Show – half a 60-minute episode (October 22, 1950) with Reginald Gardiner and Lily Ann Carol
 Captain Video and His Video Rangers – four episodes (one from 1949, one from 1952, and two from the 1950s)
 Cavalcade of Stars – two episodes hosted by Jerry Lester (June 3, 1950, and another 1950 show, although it has been suggested that the latter is a collection of skits from two episodes) and several hosted by Jackie Gleason (clips from August 19 and September 2, 1950; August 26, 1950, October 10, 1951, and clips of one or two other episodes)

 Flash Gordon – twelve episodes, ranging from October 1, 1954, to June 24, 1955
 Front Page Detective – one episode (March 16, 1951)
 The Goldbergs – 22 episodes from 1954, ranging from May 4 to the October 19 network finale
 Hold That Camera – one episode (December 1, 1950)
 The Johns Hopkins Science Review – six episodes (March 20, 1951; January 7, February 18, and May 5, 1952; February 17, 1954; and another 1954 episode)
 Kids and Company – one episode (series finale from June 1, 1952)
 Life Is Worth Living – one episode, discussing angels (according to comments on the upload, not a typical episode)
 Man Against Crime – "Murder in the Rough" (November 8, 1953) and "Murder Mountain" (December 6, 1953)
 Miss U.S. Television Grand Finals – special aired September 30, 1950
 The Morey Amsterdam Show – two episodes (April 21, 1949, and September 21 or 28, 1950)
 Okay, Mother – one episode (July 18, 1950)
 The Old American Barn Dance – seven episodes from Summer 1953
 On Your Way – one episode (January 1954)
 Public Prosecutor – "The Case of the Comic-Strip Murder" (September 20, 1951) and "The Case of the Man Who Wasn't There" (January 17, 1952)
 Rocky King, Inside Detective – four episodes (July 13 and August 31, 1952; 1953; and "One Minute for Murder")
 The School House – one episode (March 22, 1949)
 Sense and Nonsense – one episode (February 19, 1954)
 Steve Randall (a.k.a. Hollywood Off Beat) – one episode (September 11, 1952)
 They Stand Accused – one episode (late 1954)
 Tom Corbett, Space Cadet – one episode (network finale from May 22, 1954)
 Twenty Questions – one episode (January 18, 1952)
 You Asked for It – at least four episodes from 1951 (February 8, April 5, April 12 or 19, April 26, July or so); the Archive has several other episodes, but it is not certain whether those are DuMont-era shows

Held by others
 Concert Tonight – one episode (November 18, 1953) held by the Peabody Award collection
 The Johns Hopkins Science Review – most of the DuMont series survives at the Johns Hopkins University archives.  
 Keep Posted – one episode from 1952 ("Should Truman be Renominated?") held by the Peabody Award collection
 Life Is Worth Living –a large number are held by Diocese of Rochester Archives, nearly the complete run of the series.
 Man Against Crime – 28 episodes available on DVD (out of 84 episodes total)
 Meet the Boss – one episode held by the Peabody Award collection
 NFL on DuMont – highlight footage from a sideline camera, without audio, from the 1953 NFL Championship Game; also limited highlights from week 1 and week 6 Saturday Night Football games (see Pro Football Highlights below) on YouTube
 Off the Record – one episode (October 18, 1951) from WTTG with Art Lamb and Aletha Agee at YouTube
 Pro Football Highlights / Time for Football — two episodes (Week 1 and Week 6, 1954) at YouTube, this also includes limited game footage from NFL on DuMont games
 Studio 57 – entire series (including DuMont-aired episodes) is very likely held by Universal Television. Unlike most DuMont series, it was produced directly on film by an outside production company (Revue Productions), whose successor renewed the copyrights to the episodes, including those aired on DuMont, which may confirm their existence. (See US Copyright Office website for registrations.)
 This Is the Life – one episode (September 9, 1952, premiere) at YouTube
 Tom Corbett, Space Cadet – unknown number held by Wade Williams Productions
 Twenty Questions – one episode (November 16, 1953) held by DePauw University and at YouTube
 The Wendy Barrie Show – one episode at YouTube featuring Jack Shaindlin as guest
 Archivist Ira Gallen has an unknown number of DuMont network broadcasts.
 DuMont historian and former broadcaster Clarke Ingram also has an unknown number of DuMont network broadcasts.
 The estate of Dennis James may own a substantial amount of programming with him as host (some of which may have been the original source of programs in other collections); James kept an archive with samples of his work as a résumé supplement during his lifetime.
 WWE has footage of DuMont wrestling matches held in the New York/Washington D.C. area (including footage from Madison Square Garden III among other wrestling footage from this period, most notably featuring Gorgeous George), which is from WWE's direct corporate predecessor, the Capitol Wrestling Corporation. The McMahon family (in particular patriarch Jess McMahon and later Vince McMahon, Sr.), owners of the then-CWC, archived this footage on their own and not through DuMont.
 More DuMont-era wrestling footage has turned up with a collector in Japan.
 Other shows at YouTube.
 Several shows at Dailymotion
 A Roku channel, Days of DuMont, streams over 100 shows upgraded to 1080p, many with improved audio.

References

External links
Unless otherwise noted, all links are to the Internet Archive.
 DuMont kinescopes at Dailymotion
 DuMont shows on Roku (Days of DuMont)
 Kinescopes of DuMont program The Adventures of Ellery Queen: "The Hanging Acrobat" (December 21, 1950), "Man Who Enjoyed Death" (March 29, 1951), "Death Spins a Wheel" (May 10, 1951), "Murder to Music" (November 8, 1951)
 Kinescope of DuMont program The Arthur Murray Show (October 22, 1950)
 Kinescope (first half only) of DuMont program Bingo At Home (1958)
 Kinescopes of DuMont program Captain Video and His Video Rangers: 1949 episode, 1952 episode, 1950s episode #1, 1950s episode #2
 Kinescopes of DuMont program Cavalcade of Stars, with Jerry Lester: June 3, 1950, 1950 episode
 Kinescopes of DuMont program Cavalcade of Stars, with Jackie Gleason: Clips from August 19 and September 2, 1950, August 26, 1950, October 10, 1951, clips of one or two other episodes
 Kinescopes of DuMont program Flash Gordon: "The Planet of Death" (October 1, 1954 premiere), "Akim the Terrible" (November 5, 1954), "The Claim Jumpers" (November 12, 1954), "The Breath of Death" (November 26, 1954), "Return of the Androids" (December 10, 1954), "The Race against Time" (February 25, 1955), "The Witch of Neptune" (March 4, 1955), "The Brain Machine" (March 11, 1955), "Struggle to the End" (March 18, 1955), "Saboteurs from Space" (April 1, 1955), "The Forbidden Experiment" (April 8, 1955), "Deadline At Noon" (June 24, 1955)
 Kinescope of DuMont program Front Page Detective: "Alibi for Suicide" (March 16, 1951)
 Kinescopes of DuMont program The Goldbergs, all 1954: May 4, May 11, May 25, June 1, June 8, June 15, June 22, June 29, July 13, July 20, August 3, August 10, August 17, August 24, August 31, September 7, September 14, September 21, September 28, October 5, October 12, October 19 (network finale)
 Kinescope of DuMont program Hold That Camera (December 1, 1950)
 Kinescopes of DuMont program Jazz Party (September 18, October 9, and December 25, 1958)
 Kinescopes of DuMont program The Johns Hopkins Science Review: "Don't Drink that Water" (March 20, 1951), "A Visit to our Studio" (January 7, 1952), "Usefulness of Useless Knowledge" (February 18, 1952), "Great Men of Science" (May 5, 1952), "Concrete With Muscles" (February 17, 1954), "Living Together" (1954)
 Kinescope of DuMont program Kids and Company (June 1, 1952)
 Kinescope of DuMont program Life Is Worth Living: "Angels"
 Kinescopes of DuMont program Man Against Crime: "Murder in the Rough" (November 8, 1953), "Murder Mountain" (December 6, 1953)
 Kinescope of DuMont program Miss U.S. Television Grand Finals (September 30, 1950)
 Kinescope of DuMont program Off the Record (October 18, 1951) on YouTube
 Kinescope of DuMont program Okay Mother (July 18, 1950)
 Kinescopes of DuMont program The Old American Barn Dance (Summer 1953)
 Kinescope of DuMont program On Your Way (January 1954)
 Kinescopes of DuMont program Public Prosecutor: "The Comic-Strip Murder" (September 20, 1951), "The Man who Wasn't There" (January 17, 1952)
 Kinescopes of DuMont program Rocky King, Inside Detective: "Murder Scores a Knockout" (July 13, 1952), "The Hermit's Cat" (August 31, 1952), "Murder, PH.D." (1953), "One Minute for Murder"
 Kinescope of DuMont program School House (March 22, 1949)
 Kinescope of DuMont program Sense and Nonsense (February 19, 1954)
 Kinescope of DuMont program Steve Randall: "The Trial" (September 11, 1952)
 Kinescope of DuMont program They Stand Accused: "The Johnny Roberts Story" (late 1954)
 Kinescope of DuMont program This Is the Life/The Fisher Family (September 9, 1952) on YouTube
 Kinescope of DuMont program Tom Corbett: Space Cadet: "Runaway Rocket" (May 22, 1954)
 Kinescope of DuMont program Twenty Questions (January 18, 1952) on YouTube
 Kinescope of DuMont program The Wendy Barrie Show with Jack Shaindlin (1949) on YouTube: Parts 1, 2, 3, and 4
 Kinescopes of DuMont program You Asked for It: February 8, 1951; April 5, 1951; April 1951; April 26, 1951; July (or so) 1951

 

DuMont Television Network broadcasts, surviving